The May Farmstead is a historic farm property in rural eastern Newton County, Arkansas.  It is located overlooking Cave Creek, off County Road 256 east of Bens Branch Church.  The main house is a double-pen, one built out of logs in 1880, the other framed in 1910.  The house is sheathed in weatherboard siding added after the construction of the second pen, and there is a full-width porch extending across the front (southeastern) facade.  The property also includes a period barn and spring house.  It is one of the best surviving examples of a late 19th-century farmstead in the region.

The property was listed on the National Register of Historic Places in 1999.

See also
National Register of Historic Places listings in Newton County, Arkansas

References

Houses on the National Register of Historic Places in Arkansas
Houses completed in 1880
National Register of Historic Places in Newton County, Arkansas
1880 establishments in Arkansas
Farms on the National Register of Historic Places in Arkansas